Baiju is a town in Dafeng District, Yancheng, Jiangsu province, China. , it administers Haining Residential District and the following 16 villages: 
Yandi Village
Majia Village
Minyao Village
Qiliqiao Village
Tuanjie Village
Sanlishu Village
Shizikou Village
Tangshe Village
Tangxi Village
Xiao'ao Village
Jinbu Village
Xinduo Village
Zhushe Village
Dongyao Village
Yaogang Village
Yangxin Village

See also 
 List of township-level divisions of Jiangsu

References 

Township-level divisions of Jiangsu
Yancheng